Baidu Tieba is a Chinese online forum hosted by the Chinese web services company Baidu. Baidu Tieba was established on December 3, 2003 as an online community that heavily integrates Baidu's search engine. Users may search for a topic of interest forum known as a "bar" which will then be created if it does not exist already. Baidu Tieba accumulated 45 million monthly active users as of December 2021, and the number of its total registered users reached 1.5 billion. As of June 6, 2021, Baidu Tieba has 23,254,173 communities.

Introduction
Baidu Tieba uses forums called bars as a place for users to socially interact. The slogan of Baidu Tieba is "Born for your interest" (Chinese: 为兴趣而生). As of 2014, there were more than eight million bars, mostly created by fans, which covered a variety of topics, such as celebrities, films, comics, and books. More than one billion posts have been published in these bars.

According to Alexa Internet, traffic to Baidu Tieba makes up more than 10% of the total traffic to Baidu properties.

Functions
Every bar can have up to three masters, thirty vice-masters, and ten video-masters to manage uploaded videos. Users can post, at most, ten pictures and one video quoted from certain broadcast websites. Users cannot edit any published posts. However, users can delete their own published posts and comments from other users on their posts. Beyond regular text posts, Baidu Tieba allows for the use of polls. Every bar has its own 2GB space for members to upload videos. If a bar is ranked within the top 500 of the official rankings, it has its own album.

Prior to 2010, Baidu Tieba allowed anonymous posting, displaying only the IP address of the poster. Since then, users are required to have a registered account in order to post on bars. It is illegal in China to publish rumors which "threaten the social order", a crime punishable by up to 7 years jail. The onus is on service providers to police and remove such content. Baidu Tieba is no exception and warns users against the dangers of spreading false information, suggesting it is done for notoriety as well as commercial and political gain.

History
On November 25, 2003, Baidu Tieba began internal testing. It was released to the public on December 3, 2003.

It is a completely user-driven network service. The idea of the paste bar came from Yu Jun, Baidu's Chief Product Designer.
Around the same time, the paste bar was combined with the Baidu search engine, to build an online communication platform, letting people communicate to those with similar interests.

On February 25, 2005, Barzhu Bar became an official platform of Baidu Tieba, and was used for communication between the owners of different bars.

On April 15, 2009, Tieba Cloud was integrated into Baidu Tieba.

In 2012, Baidu Tieba updated its interface, switching from a simple reply-by-sequence user interface, into a more complicated reply-in-same-floor one. Along with the new interface, new functionalities such as rankings, more expressive pictures, and allowing administrators to change the background images of Tieba, were also implemented.

On May 13, 2019, topics posted in Baidu Tieba before January 1, 2017 were hidden. A Baidu official said that the topics are hidden temporarily due to “system maintenance”. The maintenance duration is about 1 month.

Baidu Tieba has become a popular comprehensive forum in China, with a large number of users actively posting, replying to each other, and interacting with each other.

International development
Baidu Postbar is the international version of Baidu Tieba.

In order to expand its commercial domain, Baidu Postbar has been introduced to several countries listed below:

 Baidu Tieba Brazil
 Baidu Tieba Thailand
 Baidu Tieba Vietnam
 Baidu Tieba Japan

In late 2011, the Japanese version of Baidu Postbar was shut down.

Since May 2015, all logins are disabled on the Vietnamese version of Baidu Postbar.

References